General elections were held in Transjordan on 16 October 1934.

Electoral system
The 1928 basic law provided for a unicameral Legislative Council. The 16 elected members were joined by the six-member cabinet, which included the Prime Minister. The term length was set at three years.

Results
The sixteen elected members were:

Aftermath
Ibrahim Hashem formed a government that included Odeh Al-Qsous, Sa`id al-Mufti, Shukri Sha'sha'h, Hashem Khiar and Qasem Al-Hindawi. It became the first government to last a full Council term.

References

Transjordan
Elections in Jordan
General election
Transjordan